Chom Thong District, Chiang Mai is a district (amphoe) in the southern part of Chiang Mai province in northern Thailand.

History
According to the legend of Wat Phra That Si Chom Thong Worawihan, the temple is on a small hill which looks similar to a termite hill (chom pluak in Thai). The hill is covered by thong kwao or Bastard teak (Butea monosperma) and Thong Lang or coral tree (Erythrina variegata) forest. Thus the people called the hill Chom Thong.

After Buddha entered parinirvana, King Asoka the Great visited the hill to place Buddha's relics there. The temple was built on the hill and named Wat Phra That Chom Thong in 1451. Later the temple was upgraded to be royal temple and at the same time renamed Wat Phra That Si Chom Thong Worawihan.

The government created a district in the area in 1900 and named the new district Chom Thong following the legend. The district office was originally in Ban Tha Sala, Tambon Khuang Pao. In 1933 the office was moved to the southwest of Wat Phra That Chom Thong.

Geography
Neighbouring districts are (from the south clockwise): Hot, Mae Chaem, Mae Wang, Doi Lo of Chiang Mai Province; Wiang Nong Long, and Ban Hong of Lamphun province.

The important watercourse is the Ping River.

Doi Inthanon National Park is in this district.

Administration

Central administration 
Chom Thong is divided into six sub-districts (tambons), which are further subdivided into 103 administrative villages (mubans).

Missing numbers are tambons which now form Doi Lo District.

Local administration 
There are six sub-district municipalities (thesaban tambon) in the district:
 Ban Luang consisting of parts of sub-district Ban Luang.
 Sop Tia consisting of sub-district Sop Tia.
 Ban Pae consisting of sub-district Ban Pae.
 Doi Kaeo consisting of parts of sub-district Doi Kaeo.
 Mae Soi consisting of sub-district Mae Soi.
 Chom Thong consisting of parts of sub-districts Ban Luang, Khuang Pao, and Doi Kaeo.

There is one sub-district administrative organization (SAO) in the district:
 Khuang Pao consisting of parts of sub-district Khuang Pao.

References

External links
Amphoe.com on Chom Thong

Chom Thong